The Netherlands Football League Championship 1929–1930 was contested by 50 teams participating in five divisions. The national champion would be determined by a play-off featuring the winners of the eastern, northern, southern and two western football divisions of the Netherlands. Go Ahead won this year's championship by beating AFC Ajax, Velocitas 1897, Willem II and Blauw-Wit Amsterdam.

New entrants
Eerste Klasse East:
Promoted from 2nd Division: PEC Zwolle
Eerste Klasse North:
Promoted from 2nd Division: LAC Frisia 1883
Eerste Klasse West-I:
Moving in from West-II: DFC, HBS Craeyenhout, SBV Excelsior and VSV
Promoted from 2nd Division: HFC Haarlem
Eerste Klasse West-II:
Moving in from West-I: Hermes DVS, Koninklijke HFC, Stormvogels and VUC

Divisions

Eerste Klasse East

Eerste Klasse North

Eerste Klasse South

Eerste Klasse West-I

Eerste Klasse West-II

Championship play-off

References
RSSSF Netherlands Football League Championships 1898-1954
RSSSF Eerste Klasse Oost
RSSSF Eerste Klasse Noord
RSSSF Eerste Klasse Zuid
RSSSF Eerste Klasse West

Netherlands Football League Championship seasons
Neth
Neth